The Lost Express is a 1926 American silent mystery film directed by J.P. McGowan and starring Helen Holmes, Jack Mower, and Henry A. Barrows.

Cast

References

Bibliography
 Munden, Kenneth White. The American Film Institute Catalog of Motion Pictures Produced in the United States, Part 1. University of California Press, 1997.

External links

1926 films
1926 mystery films
American mystery films
Films directed by J. P. McGowan
American silent feature films
Rayart Pictures films
American black-and-white films
1920s English-language films
1920s American films
Silent mystery films